Michael Chang defeated Stefan Edberg in the final, 6–1, 3–6, 4–6, 6–4, 6–2, to win the men's singles tennis title at the 1989 French Open. En route to the title, he defeated the world No. 1 and three-time champion Ivan Lendl, which is remembered as one of the most significant matches in French Open history.

Mats Wilander was the defending champion, but he lost in the quarterfinals to Andrei Chesnokov.

Seeds

Draw

Finals

Top half

Section 1

Section 2

Section 3

Section 4

Bottom half

Section 5

Section 6

Section 7

Section 8

External links
 Association of Tennis Professionals (ATP) – 1989 French Open Men's Singles draw
1989 French Open – Men's draws and results at the International Tennis Federation

Men's Singles
1989
1989 Grand Prix (tennis)